William J. Bowler (born September 25, 1974) is a Canadian former professional ice hockey centre. He played nine games in the National Hockey League with the Columbus Blue Jackets during the 2000–01 season. The rest of his career, which lasted from 1995 to 2003, was spent in the minor leagues. He is currently the General Manager of the Windsor Spitfires in the Ontario Hockey League.

Biography
As a youth, Bowler played in the 1988 Quebec International Pee-Wee Hockey Tournament with a minor ice hockey team from Mississauga.

In 1994–95, while playing for the Ontario Hockey League's Windsor Spitfires, Bowler was awarded the Leo Lalonde Memorial Trophy as the best overage player in the league. During four seasons with the Windsor Spitfires, from the 1991-92 season to the 1994–95 season, Bill Bowler set a franchise record for most career points, with 467 points. He also set the OHL record for most career assists, with 318. , both records still stand. On December 10, 2011, Bowler's number 9 was retired by the Windsor Spitfires - he was the eighth player in Windsor Spitfire history to have his jersey hung from the rafters.

Bowler played nine games with the Columbus Blue Jackets in the 2000–01 season, recording two assists. In 2000–01, Bowler set a team record for the AHL's Syracuse Crunch with 58 assists, and tied the team record with 79 points (set in 1995–96 by Lonny Bohonos. This record would be later be broken by Carter Verhaeghe in the 2018-19 season).

Bowler also played professionally in the International Hockey League, and the Deutsche Eishockey Liga.

In 2015, Bowler entered his third season as general manager and head coach of the LaSalle Vipers. He had previously served as the general manager and head coach of the Chatham Maroons for two seasons.

In July 2019, it was announced Bowler would take over for Warren Rychel as General Manager of the Windsor Spitfires for the 2019-20 season.

Career statistics

Regular season and playoffs

References

External links
 

1974 births
Living people
Canadian expatriate ice hockey players in Germany
Canadian ice hockey centres
Columbus Blue Jackets players
Hamilton Bulldogs (AHL) players
Houston Aeros (1994–2013) players
Krefeld Pinguine players
Las Vegas Thunder players
Manitoba Moose (IHL) players
Milwaukee Admirals players
Norfolk Admirals players
Ice hockey people from Toronto
Syracuse Crunch players
Undrafted National Hockey League players
Windsor Spitfires players